Lebed-Sergeyevka is a rural locality (a selo) in Morozovskoye Rural Settlement, Rossoshansky District, Voronezh Oblast, Russia. The population was 121 as of 2010.

Geography 
Lebed-Sergeyevka is located 34 km southeast of Rossosh (the district's administrative centre) by road. Krinichnoye is the nearest rural locality.

References 

Rural localities in Rossoshansky District